Jean Mondielli (13 September 1882 – 31 May 1955) was a French modern pentathlete. He competed at the 1920 Summer Olympics.

References

External links
 

1882 births
1955 deaths
Sportspeople from Béziers
French male modern pentathletes
Olympic modern pentathletes of France
Modern pentathletes at the 1920 Summer Olympics